Division No. 6 is one of eighteen census divisions in the province of Saskatchewan, Canada, as defined by Statistics Canada. It is located in the south-central part of the province. The most populous community in this division is Regina, the provincial capital.

Demographics 

Census subdivisions 
The following census subdivisions (municipalities or municipal equivalents) are located within Saskatchewan's Division No. 6.

Cities
Regina

Towns
Balcarres
Balgonie
Cupar
Fort Qu'Appelle
Francis
Grand Coulee
Indian Head
Lumsden
Pilot Butte
Qu'Appelle
Regina Beach
Rouleau
Sintaluta
Southey
Strasbourg
White City

Villages

Abernethy
Belle Plaine
Bethune
Briercrest
Buena Vista
Bulyea
Chamberlain
Craven
Dilke
Disley
Drinkwater
Dysart
Earl Grey
Edenwold
Findlater
Holdfast
Kendal
Lebret
Lipton
Markinch
McLean
Montmartre
Odessa
Pense
Sedley
Silton
Vibank
Wilcox

Resort villages

Alice Beach
B-Say-Tah
Fort San
Glen Harbour
Grandview Beach
Island View
Kannata Valley
Katepwa
Lumsden Beach
North Grove
Pelican Pointe
Saskatchewan Beach
Sunset Cove
Wee Too Beach

Rural municipalities

 RM No. 126 Montmartre
 RM No. 127 Francis
 RM No. 128 Lajord
 RM No. 129 Bratt's Lake
 RM No. 130 Redburn
 RM No. 156 Indian Head
 RM No. 157 South Qu'Appelle
 RM No. 158 Edenwold
 RM No. 159 Sherwood
 RM No. 160 Pense
 RM No. 186 Abernethy
 RM No. 187 North Qu'Appelle
 RM No. 189 Lumsden
 RM No. 190 Dufferin
 RM No. 216 Tullymet
 RM No. 217 Lipton
 RM No. 218 Cupar
 RM No. 219 Longlaketon
 RM No. 220 McKillop
 RM No. 221 Sarnia

Indian reserves

 Treaty Four Reserve Grounds 77 (shared by 33 First Nations)
 Carry the Kettle Nakoda First Nation
 Assiniboine 76
 Little Black Bear First Nation
 Little Black Bear 84
 Muscowpetung First Nation
 Muscowpetung 80
 Okanese First Nation
 Okanese 82
 Pasqua First Nation
 Pasqua 79
 Peepeekisis Cree Nation
 Peepeekisis 81
 Piapot Cree Nation
 Piapot 75
 Standing Buffalo Dakota Nation
 Standing Buffalo 78
 Star Blanket Cree Nation
 Atim Ka-mihkosit Reserve
 Star Blanket 83
 Star Blanket 83C
 Wa-pii-moos-toosis 83A

See also 
List of census divisions of Saskatchewan
List of communities in Saskatchewan

References

Division No. 6, Saskatchewan Statistics Canada

 
06